John Edward Newton (16 June 1908 – 	4 January 1993) was a British trade unionist.

Born in Lofthouse in Yorkshire, Newton began work in tailoring at the age of 21.  He won awards for his cutting and design skills, but increasingly came to focus on trade unionism.

Newton was elected as the president of the Middlesbrough branch of the National Union of Tailors and Garment Workers (NUTGW) in 1939, he was elected to the union's executive council in 1943, then became assistant regional organiser for the North of England in 1947 and then regional organiser in 1948.  In 1952, he was elected as the union's general secretary, taking over from Anne Loughlin the following year.  He also served as president of the International Textile and Garment Workers' Federation from its formation, then as the first president of the new International Textile, Garment and Leather Workers' Federation, standing down in 1972.

Newton resigned as secretary of the NUTGW in 1968, citing the pressure of work.  He also served on the executive council of the Trades Union Congress (TUC), and was President of the TUC in 1969.

References

1908 births
1993 deaths
Trade unionists from Leeds
General Secretaries of the National Union of Tailors and Garment Workers
Members of the General Council of the Trades Union Congress
People from Leeds
Presidents of the Trades Union Congress